The 1915 Cork Intermediate Hurling Championship was the seventh staging of the Cork Intermediate Hurling Championship since its establishment by the Cork County Board.

Shamrocks won the championship following a 7-2 to 3-3 defeat of Castletownroche in the final.

Results

Final

References

Cork Intermediate Hurling Championship
Cork Intermediate Hurling Championship